Debra Schutt (born 1955) is an American set decorator and art director. She was nominated at the 81st Academy Awards in the category of Best Art Direction for her work on the film Revolutionary Road. She shared her nomination with art director Kristi Zea.

Selected filmography

 Navy SEALs (1990)
 Fried Green Tomatoes (1991)
 A Bronx Tale (1993)
 Last Action Hero (1993)
 Picture Perfect (1997)
 The Horse Whisperer (1998)
 Sleepy Hollow (1999)
 Changing Lanes (2002)
 Spider-Man (2002)
 Elf (2003)
 Rent (2005)
 Revolutionary Road (2008)
 The Dictator (2012)
 Noah (2014)
 Teenage Mutant Ninja Turtles (2014)

References

External links

1955 births
Living people
American art directors
American set decorators
BAFTA winners (people)
People from Webster, New York